Antonino Paternò Castello, Marquess of San Giuliano (9 December 1852 – 16 October 1914), was an Italian diplomat and Minister of Foreign Affairs.

Early life and political career
Antonino Paternò Castello was born in Catania, Sicily, in a family of ancient Aragonese-Sicilian nobility. In his younger years he studied economics and sociology, and published articles on agriculture, industry, population, labour legislation, and emigration in various journals.

In 1882 he was elected to parliament and aligned himself with Sidney Sonnino, representing the conservatives who identified with the old Historical Right. In the early years of the 20th century, he focused on foreign policy in the years of the polarization of European powers into the Triple Alliance and Triple Entente blocs. He was convinced that Italy's national interest could best advanced by balancing itself between the two competing alliances.

Foreign policy
He conducted a policy of friendship toward France, while remaining faithful to Italy's commitments to Austria-Hungary and the German Empire. He served as foreign minister (1905–1906), ambassador to London (1906–1909), ambassador to Paris (1909–1910), and foreign minister (1910–1914). An advocate of colonial expansion, his diplomacy cleared the way for the occupation of Libya during the Italo-Turkish War (1911–1912). He resisted the expansion of Austria-Hungary in the Balkans, supported Italian economic penetration of Montenegro, and the independence of Albania.

World War I
When World War I broke out, he implemented a policy of neutrality but did not rule out intervention, according to Prime Minister Antonio Salandra's policy of "sacred egoism" (sacro egoismo). Negotiating with both the Triple Entente and Triple Alliance powers, he insisted on gaining maximum territorial concessions for participation in the war to fulfill Italy’s irredentist claims.

He became seriously ill in October 1914 and retired. His successor, Sidney Sonnino, followed the negotiating strategy set by San Giuliano, leading to the secret Treaty of London or London Pact with the Triple Entente. According to the pact, Italy was to leave the Triple Alliance and join the Triple Entente. Italy was to declare war against Germany and Austria-Hungary within a month in return for territorial concessions at the end of the war.

Honours 
 
 1 December 1907: Grand Cross of the Order of Saints Maurice and Lazarus
 1910: Grand Cross of the Order of the Crown of Italy
 21 October 1912: Knight of the Supreme Order of the Most Holy Annunciation
  1910: Grand Cordon of the Order of Leopold
  19 May 1910: Grand Cross of the Order of Saint-Charles

See also
 Italian entry into World War I

References

Further reading
 Bosworth, Richard J.B. Italy the Least of the Great Powers: Italian Foreign Policy Before the First World War (2005).
 Clark, Martin (2008). Modern Italy: 1871 to the present, Harlow: Pearson Education, 
 Lowe, Cedric J. "Britain and Italian Intervention, 1914–1915." Historical Journal 12.3 (1969): 533-548.
 Renzi, William A. In the Shadow of the Sword: Italy's Neutrality and Entrance into the Great War, 1914-1915 (1987).
 Sarti, Roland (2004). Italy: a reference guide from the Renaissance to the present, New York: Facts on File Inc.,

External links
 

1852 births
1914 deaths
Politicians from Catania
Foreign ministers of Italy
Members of the Chamber of Deputies (Kingdom of Italy)
Deputies of Legislature XV of the Kingdom of Italy
Deputies of Legislature XVI of the Kingdom of Italy
Deputies of Legislature XVII of the Kingdom of Italy
Deputies of Legislature XVIII of the Kingdom of Italy
Deputies of Legislature XIX of the Kingdom of Italy
Deputies of Legislature XX of the Kingdom of Italy
Deputies of Legislature XXI of the Kingdom of Italy
Nobility from Catania
Knights Grand Cross of the Order of Saints Maurice and Lazarus
Recipients of the Order of the Crown (Italy)
Grand Crosses of the Order of Saint-Charles